Rawdat Egdaim (also spelled Rawdat Ekdaim) is a district in Qatar, located in the municipality of Al Rayyan.

In the 2015 census it was listed as a district of Zone 51, which has a population of 56,027 and also includes Izghawa, Gharrafat Al Rayyan, Al Gharrafa, Al Seej, Bani Hajer and Al Themaid.

It is bordered to the south by Bani Hajer and to the east by Gharrafat Al Rayyan. To the north is Umm Salal Municipality.

Etymology
The first word of the district's name has its roots in the Arabic term "rawda", which means "a fertile depression that is usually rich in vegetation". Typically, these depressions are excellent sites for grazing livestock. "Egdaim", the second part of the name, is an alternate spelling of "aqdaim", which itself originates from "qadam", the Arabic word for "foot". This name was bestowed on the area because the rawda has a foot-like shape.

References

Populated places in Al Rayyan